Stephen Bernard Streater (born 1965) is a British technology entrepreneur.

Career 
Streater was born in Boston Lying-In Hospital, Massachusetts, United States. He achieved a degree in mathematics from Trinity College, Cambridge and then began a PhD on artificial pattern recognition in the physics department at King's College London.

In 1990, he co-founded Eidos, a company specialising in video compression and non-linear editing systems, particularly for computers running the RISC OS operating system. He later sold and left Eidos, which had moved into the computer games market, and founded Blackbird in 2000, where he was the company's R&D Director.

On 21 July 2011, Streater was honoured by the University of Bedfordshire with a Doctor of Science degree in recognition of "outstanding contribution to the development of computer technologies."

Personal life 
Streater is married to Victoria Jane (née Fantl) and has three daughters (Sophie, Juliette and Emily). He has a sister (Catherine) and a brother (Alexander). His hobbies include playing classical chamber and orchestral music, Go, new technology, and making videos. Streater's father, Ray Streater, is a professor of mathematics at King's College London.

References

External links 
Blackbird plc
Stephen Bernard Streater, inventor – from his father's website

1965 births
Alumni of Trinity College, Cambridge
Alumni of King's College London
English businesspeople
Living people